D. Jacob Davies (15 September 1916 – 11 February 1974) was a Welsh Unitarian minister who became a prominent figure within Welsh public life and within his denomination in Wales and beyond.

Early life
Jacob Davies was born on 15 September 1916 at Penlon, Tregroes, near Llandysul, one of the five children of David and Mary Davies. He was educated at Tregroes Primary School before earning a scholarship to Llandysul Grammar School in 1929, where he remained until 1936. He then became a student at Carmarthen Presbyterian College to prepare for the Unitarian ministry. After some years in Carmarthen he became minister of the Capel Bach, the Unitarian chapel in Aberystwyth, where he enrolled as a student at the University and graduated in 1945.

Hen-Dy-Cwrdd
Although Davies had intended to study for an MA degree, he received a call to minister the Unitarian churches at Highland Place, Aberdare and Hen-Dy-Cwrdd, Trecynon. The latter was the oldest nonconformist place of worship in the Aberdare Valley. As well as his duties as a minister, Davies played a wider role in the life of Aberdare, including supporting the movement to establish a Welsh-medium primary school, Ysgol Gymraeg Aberdar.

Return to Cardiganshire
In 1957, Jacob Davies returned to his native area to minister the three Unitarian churches at Alltyblacca; Capel y Bryn, Cwrtnewydd and Cwmsychbant. He remained there until his death in 1974.

Davies was an active broadcaster, writer and journalist, and edited the Unitarian journal, Yr Ymofynnydd. He was an active campaigner for pensioners' rights and the Pensioner of Wales from 1955 until 1973. He was in demand to preside at the National Eisteddfod of Wales and the Llangollen International Eisteddfod. Politically, Davies supported Plaid Cymru, and unsuccessfully stood as a candidate in the inaugural Dyfed County Council election in 1973. He finished fourth with 21% of the vote.

Together with these various activities, Davies was prominent in his denomination beyond Wales and at the time of his death was President of the General Unitarian Assembly.

Death
Davies died suddenly on 11 February 1974. He was buried four days later at Bwlchydadfa Cemetery, Talgarreg.

References

Sources

Books and Journals

Online

1917 births
1974 deaths
Plaid Cymru politicians
Welsh Unitarians
People educated at Llandysul Grammar School